Stephen Daisley (born 1955) is a New Zealand novelist.

Daisley won the 2011 Prime Minister's Literary Award for Fiction for his novel Traitor and the Ockham New Zealand Book Award, 2016, for his second novel Coming Rain.

Biography 
He was born in New Zealand and spent five years in the New Zealand army before working as a sheep herder, bush cutter, truck driver, construction worker and bartender. He now lives in Perth, Western Australia.

Bibliography

Novels
 Traitor (2010)
 Coming Rain (2015)

Awards 
 2011 winner Prime Minister's Literary Awards — Fiction – Traitor
 2011 winner New South Wales Premier's Literary Awards — UTS Award for New Writing – Traitor
 2011 shortlisted New South Wales Premier's Literary Awards — Christina Stead Prize for Fiction – Traitor
 2011 shortlisted Commonwealth Writers Prize South East Asia and South Pacific Region — Best First Book – Traitor
 2010 shortlisted Western Australian Premier's Book Awards — Fiction – Traitor
 2016 winner Ockham New Zealand Book Award — Fiction – Coming Rain with a prize of $50,000

References

1955 births
Living people
21st-century New Zealand novelists